The 2010–11 Wofford Terriers men's basketball team represented Wofford College during the 2010–11 NCAA Division I men's basketball season. The Terriers, led by 9th year head coach Mike Young, played their home games at Benjamin Johnson Arena and are members of the Southern Conference. They finished the season 21–13, 14–4 in SoCon play. They were champions of the 2011 Southern Conference men's basketball tournament to earn their second consecutive automatic bid in the 2011 NCAA Division I men's basketball tournament where they lost in the second round to Brigham Young.

Roster

Schedule
 
|-
!colspan=9 style=| Regular season

|-
!colspan=9 style=| SoCon tournament

|-
!colspan=9 style=| NCAA tournament

References

Wofford
Wofford
Wofford Terriers men's basketball seasons
Southern Conference men's basketball champion seasons
Wolf
Wolf